Navi-ye Shest (also Romanized as Nāvī-ye Sheṣt) is a village in Gevar Rural District, Sarduiyeh District, Jiroft County, Kerman Province, Iran. At the 2006 census, its population was seventeen, in five families.

References 

Populated places in Jiroft County